Zoltán Kiss (born 18 August 1980 in Püspökladány) is a Hungarian football player who currently plays for Panserraikos F.C.

He started playing football at the age of 7 and the talented lad was offered to DVSC where he went on step by step through the different age groups scoring some beautiful goals as he was played up front at the time. Later on he went to Bocskai to return to DVSC from there. Herczeg András sent him on against Újpest in 1997 during his first reign at Debrecen. The 17-year-old scored his first goal on his second game for the club. Although a regular member of the team he got free transferred in 1999 because of the financial trouble at the club. He was signed by Belgian club Beershot Antwerp to spend 2 years in the Belgian first division. He returned to Loki in 2001 to be part of the successful championship campaign in 2005. Now three times champion and two times Hungarian Cup winner and counts five international caps under Lothar Mattheus and Péter Bozsik. Different DVSC managers have played him in different positions but none of them could imagine the starting eleven without the enthusiastic midfielder. And though he feels most comfortable on the right hand side of the pitch he now runs the team from deep as a defending midfielder lately.

He moved to Panserraikos in January 2011 on a free transfer after his contract ran out at Debrecen.

National team
Kiss made his debut on 25 April 2004, in Zalaegerszeg against Japan.

(Statistics correct as of 16 August 2009)

International matches

External links
 http://www.dvsc.hu
 

1980 births
Living people
People from Püspökladány
Hungarian footballers
Association football midfielders
Nemzeti Bajnokság I players
Debreceni VSC players
Beerschot A.C. players
Hungarian expatriate footballers
Expatriate footballers in Belgium
Hungarian expatriate sportspeople in Belgium
Hungary international footballers
Expatriate footballers in Greece
Panserraikos F.C. players
Hungarian expatriate sportspeople in Greece
Sportspeople from Hajdú-Bihar County